Andrea Deck (born February 5, 1994) is an American film, television and theater actress. She trained at the London Academy of Music and Dramatic Art. She is best known for her voice role as Amanda Ripley, daughter of Ellen Ripley, in Alien: Isolation, as well as her role as CIA agent Jenna Bragg on the Showtime series Homeland.

Early life
Deck was born February 5, 1994, and grew up in Grosse Pointe, Michigan. At the age of 15, she began attending the Interlochen Center for the Arts summer camp until she graduated from Grosse Pointe South High School at the age of 18. She subsequently moved to London, England, to study at the London Academy of Music and Dramatic Art. She graduated with a bachelor's degree with honors in professional acting.

Career
Deck's first acting role was in the film In Love With a Nun, which was screened at the Short Film Corner of the Cannes Film Festival in 2009.

She subsequently appeared as an extra in Tom Hooper's 2012 film adaptation of Les Miserables. In the same year, she was cast as Allie in Roland Joffé's The Lovers, and as opera singer Charlotte Watson in the film The Devil's Violinist directed by Bernard Rose in which she showcased her classically trained singing voice, as well as appearing in Ridley Scott's The Counselor later that year.

She later went on to play silent-movie star Mabel Normand in ITV's Mr Selfridge. In April 2013, she co-founded London-based production company Tough Dance Ltd. with actor Ben Cura.

Deck voiced Amanda Ripley in video game Alien: Isolation, which also starred Sigourney Weaver and the cast of Ridley Scott's original film. Later, she reprised the role in Alien: Blackout. She also starred in a film adaptation of August Strindberg's play Creditors, directed by Ben Cura, playing writer Chloe Fleury, as well as being a producer on the film. In 2015, she played the lead female character in British horror film The Ghost Writer, due for release in 2016.

In 2018, she played murder victim Mahalia Geary in BBC2's adaptation of China Miéville's The City & The City. In 2020 she played an important role as CIA agent Jenna Bragg on season 8 of Homeland.

Personal life 
Deck has type 1 diabetes, and runs a YouTube channel and an Instagram account about dealing with the condition.

Filmography

Actor

Producer

Voice work

Web

References

External links 

Living people
1994 births
21st-century American actresses
Alumni of the London Academy of Music and Dramatic Art
American emigrants to England
American expatriate actresses in the United Kingdom
American film actresses
American video game actresses
American voice actresses
People from Grosse Pointe, Michigan
People with type 1 diabetes